Tony Vitello (born October 9, 1978) is an American college baseball coach and former infielder. Vitello played college baseball at the University of Missouri from 2001 to 2002 under head coach Tim Jamieson. He was announced as the new Tennessee coach on June 7, 2017.

Head coaching record

See also
List of current NCAA Division I baseball coaches

References

1978 births
Living people
Arkansas Razorbacks baseball coaches
Missouri Tigers baseball coaches
Missouri Tigers baseball players
TCU Horned Frogs baseball coaches
Tennessee Volunteers baseball coaches